The following list of awards are presented at the Annual Wellington Phoenix awards evening usually held at the conclusion of the regular home and away season.

Player of the Year
The top award is voted for by coaches, chief executive and the football operations manager. After each game points would be awarded to the 3 top players and the player with the most accumulated points at the conclusion of the regular season is presented with the award. The award is currently referred to as the Huawei Player of the Year for sponsorship reasons.

Players' Player of the Year
The Wellington Phoenix Players' Player of the Year award is presented to the player who is deemed to be the best player overall at the end of the season as judged by his teammates. Each player in the team votes three times over the season: after Round 7, Round 14 and Round 21.

Under-23 Player of the Year
The Wellington Phoenix Under-23 Player of the Year is voted upon by all season member ticket holders at the conclusion of the regular season. The Player with the most votes is awarded the trophy.

Golden Boot
The Wellington Phoenix Golden Boot is awarded to the player who has scored the most goals during the regular season (Finals Series' goals are not included in this tally).

Goal of the Year

Members' Player of the Year
The Wellington Phoenix Members' Player of the Year award was voted upon by all season member ticket holders at the conclusion of the regular season. The Player with most votes was awarded the trophy.

Media Player of the Year

Lloyd Morrison Spirit of the Phoenix Award

Bandage Award
Selected by ex-Phoenix player, Ben Sigmund and awarded to the player who has shown the most fight, resilience and determination throughout the season.

Staff Member of the Year

Volunteer of the Year

Fan of the Year

Awards summary
2007–08 Awards
2008–09 Awards
2009–10 Awards
2010–11 Awards
2011–12 Awards
2014–15 Awards
2015–16 Awards
2016–17 Awards
2017–18 Awards
2018–19 Awards
2019–20 Awards (See references below)

References

Wellington Phoenix FC